Sylvia Eder (born 24 August 1965) is a former Austrian alpine skier.

Biography
Born in Leogang, she won her first downhill race at Bad Gastein, Austria in 1982 at the age of 17. The downhill remained her specialty discipline throughout her early career. She later developed an interest in the slalom, at which she won the world championship in 1985 in Bormio and the silver medal, after Erika Hess of Switzerland, at the World Cup in 1987.

Later Eder focused on the giant slalom and the super-G, the latter becoming her main discipline. In 1993 she won a silver medal at the Alpine World Ski Championships in Morioka. Nearly 13 years after her first World Cup victory, in December 1994 she once again celebrated a success, winning the super-G at Vail, Colorado before her team colleague Veronika Wallinger.

The alpine skier Elfi Eder is her younger sister.

World Cup victories

References

External links
 
 

1965 births
Austrian female alpine skiers
Living people
Olympic alpine skiers of Austria
Alpine skiers at the 1984 Winter Olympics
Alpine skiers at the 1988 Winter Olympics
Alpine skiers at the 1992 Winter Olympics
Alpine skiers at the 1994 Winter Olympics
20th-century Austrian women
21st-century Austrian women